The 19037 / 19038 Bandra Terminus–Gorakhpur Avadh Express is an Express train belonging to Indian Railways – Western Railways zone that runs between Bandra Terminus and  in India. It is only train in India which runs with highest number of sleeper coaches i.e. S15

It operates as train number 19037 from Bandra Terminus to Gorakhpur Junction and as train number 19038 in the reverse direction.

Coaches

The 19037/38 Bandra Terminus–Gorakhpur Avadh Express presently has coaches 1 AC 2 tier, 4 AC 3 tier, 14 Sleeper class, 2 General Unreserved, 2 Seating cum Luggage Rake. In addition, it has 1 Pantry car.

Coach composition

Timetable

Service

19037 Bandra Terminus–Gorakhpur Avadh Express covers the distance of 1846 kilometres in 39 hrs 00 mins (60 km/hr).
19038 Gorakhpur–Bandra Terminus Avadh Express covers the distance of 1846 kilometres in 39 hrs 00 mins (60 km/hr).

Routeing

Timings

19037 Bandra Terminus–Gorakhpur Avadh Express leaves Bandra Terminus every Tuesday, Wednesday, Friday, Sunday at 22:40 PM IST and reaches Gorakhpur Junction at 13:45 PM IST on the 3rd day.
19038 Gorakhpur–Bandra Terminus Avadh Express leaves Gorakhpur Junction every Monday, Wednesday, Friday, Saturday at 13:20 PM IST and reaches Bandra Terminus at 03:35 AM IST on the 3rd day.

Traction

It is hauled by a Vadodara-based WAP-7 (HOG)-equipped locomotive from end to end.

Rake sharing

The train shares its rake with 19040 Bandra Terminus–Muzaffarpur Avadh Express and 19039 Muzaffarpur–Bandra Terminus Avadh Express.

External links

References 

Transport in Mumbai
Passenger trains originating from Gorakhpur
Express trains in India
Rail transport in Maharashtra
Rail transport in Gujarat
Rail transport in Rajasthan